Santiago Muñoz may refer to:

 Santiago Montoya Muñoz, born 1991, Colombian footballer
 Santiago Muñoz (footballer, born 1999), Colombian footballer
 Santiago Muñoz (footballer, born 2002), Mexican footballer
 Santiago Muñoz Machado, Spanish jurist and academic